The Creston Valley Thunder Cats are a junior 'B' ice hockey team based in Creston, British Columbia, Canada. They are members of the Eddie Mountain Division of the Kootenay Conference of the Kootenay International Junior Hockey League (KIJHL). The Thunder Cats play their home games at Johnny Bucyk Arena. Kelly Everett is the team's president, Bill Rotheisler is the general manager and coach.

The Thunder Cats joined the KIJHL in 2000 as an expansion team, after they played junior 'A' in the RMJHL from 1992-99.

The Creston Valley Thunder Cats were named hosts of the 2017 Cyclone Taylor Cup, being the first time that the Creston Valley hosted the Junior B Provincial Championships.

History

Before the Thunder Cats, Creston also had a junior 'B' team in the Kootenay International Junior Hockey League (KIJHL), the Creston Clippers, before folding in 1985.

The Creston Thunder were founded in 1992 as a junior 'A' team in the Rocky Mountain Junior Hockey League. By the 1998–99 season, the RMJHL had fallen to four teams and was playing a lot of interleague with the America West Hockey League. The Creston Thunder could not afford the travel and opted to leave the RMJHL, effectively forcing the league to fold, at the end of the 1999 playoffs. The team sat out for the 1999–2000 season to reorganize. Prior to the 2000–01 season, the team was renamed the Creston Valley Thunder Cats and joined the Kootenay International Junior Hockey League.

In the 2007–2008 season, Joe Martin and Mike Young were hired as co-coaches, with Joe Martin becoming the head coach and general manager at the start of the 2008–2009 season.  At the end of the 2010–2011 season Joe Martin moved on to the Merritt Centennials of the BCHL as an assistant coach.

The start of the 2011–2012 season seen former Castlegar Rebels Head Coach Brent Heaven take over the head coach / general manager role.  The team played a strong competitive season, but lost in the divisional semi-finals against the Kimberly Dynamiters.  At the end of the season, Brent assumed the role of assistant coach of the Trail Smoke Eaters in the BCHL.

The Creston Valley Thunder Cats hired newcomer coach Josh Hepditch upon his retirement of semi-pro hockey.  Although the Thunder Cats played a high tempo competitive brand of hockey during the 2012–2013 season, the team fell short of making the playoffs.  With Josh Hepditch returning for a second season, the Creston Valley Thunder Cats brought an exciting line up of new and returning players that finished first in the Eddie Mountain Division with 80 points, and setting a team record of 39 wins during the campaign.  In the first round, the Creston Valley Thunder Cats disposed of the Columbia Valley Rockies in 4 straight games, to meet the Kimberly Dynamiters in the second round.  In game seven, the Thunder Cats made up a three-goal deficit in the third period and take the lead with less than 2 minutes in the third in front of a sell out crowd at the Johnny Bucyk Arena.  However, the Thunder Cats only won the first game of the Conference finals to lose to the eventual KIJHL Champions Beaver Valley Night Hawks.

With a successful year in the 2013–2014 season, including winning the KIJHL Coach of the Year, Josh Hepditch moved onto the head coach / general manager of the Amherst Wranglers, a Junior A team in the MHL.  For the third time in four years, the Thunder Cats were looking for a head coach and general manager, bringing in Jeff Dubois, former head coach / general manager of the Selkirk Saints of the BC Intercollegiate Hockey League.  Jeff Dubois had built coach the Selkirk Saints to two back to back championships bringing solid coaching credentials to his new role in as a head coach of the Thunder Cats.  In his first two seasons, the teams made the playoffs, losing to the eventual KIJHL Champions the Kimberly Dynamiters in the first round in 2014-2015, and then again to the Kimberly Dynamiters in the second round.  Kimberly Dynamiters played in the KIJHL finals, losing to the 100 Mile House Wranglers in the 2015–2016 championship round.

The Creston Valley Thunder Cats organization put together a bid to BC Amateur Hockey in the spring of 2016 to host the Cyclone Taylor Cup, the Provincial Championship for Junior B hockey in British Columbia.  The present format of the tournament has the league champions of the Pacific Junior Hockey League (PJHL), the Vancouver Island Junior Hockey League (VIJHL), the Kootenay International Junior Hockey League (KIJHL) and the host team play a round robin format to determine placement in the gold and bronze medal games.  In May 2016, BC Amateur Hockey announced that the successful bid for hosting the 2017 Cyclone Taylor Cup was to the Creston Valley, making it the first time the Provincial Championship tournament is played in Creston.  The tournament was played April 6 to April 9, 2017. The Thunder Cats finished as bronze medalists in the tournament.

Season-by-season record

Note: GP = Games played, W = Wins, L = Losses, T = Ties, OTL = Overtime Losses, Pts = Points, GF = Goals for, GA = Goals against

Records as of March 14, 2017.

Playoffs

Cyclone Taylor Cup 

 Notes

 The RMJHL playoffs had three playoff rounds.
 The final 1998-99 RMJHL playoffs had two playoff rounds.

Awards and trophies
Coach of the Year
Rob Boyd: 2003-04 (Divisional)
Shane Lukinchuk: 2006-07 (Divisional)
Joe Martin: 2010-11 (Divisional)
Josh Hepditch: 2013-14 (Divisional and League)
Jeff Dubois: 2016-17 (Divisional and League)
Brad Tobin: 2017-18 (Divisional)

Most Sportsmanlike
Keven Cann: 2009-10 (Divisional)
Jesse Collins: 2013-14 (Divisional)
Carson Cartwright: 2014-15 (Divisional)
Carson Cartwright: 2015-16 (Divisional and League)
Sebastian Kilcommons: 2016-17 (Divisional)

Most Valuable Player
Wade Waters: 2007-08 (Divisional)
Cole Yurkowski: 2008-09
Jesse Collins: 2011-12 (Divisional)
Trevor Hanna: 2013-14 (Divisional)
Sebastian Kilcommons: 2016-17 (Divisional)

Rookie of the Year
Chris Kostiuk: 2001-02 (Divisional)
Andrew Wasmuth: 2003-04 (Divisional)
Trevor Forward: 2011-12 (Divisional)
Logan Styler: 2013-14 (Divisional)Top Defenseman
Colton Grolla: 2008-09
Sebastian Kilcommons: 2016-17 (Divisional)

Top Goaltender
James Patterson: 2004-05 (Divisional)
Wade Waters: 2007-08 (Divisional)
Kyle Michalovsky: 2013-14 (Divisional and League)
Brock Lefebvre: 2016-17 (Divisional)

Top Scorer
Darryl Adams: 2001-02 (Divisional)
Aaron Jakubec: 2003-04 (Divisional)
Cole Yurkowski: 2008-09
Jesse Collins: 2013-14 (Divisional)
Paxton Malone: 2016-17 (Divisional)

See also
Creston Clippers

References

External links
Official Website of the Creston Valley Thunder Cats

Ice hockey teams in British Columbia
1992 establishments in British Columbia
Ice hockey clubs established in 1992